Min barndoms jul may refer to:

Min barndoms jul (Charlotte Perrelli album), 2013
Min barndoms jul (Mia Marianne och Per Filip album), 1978

See also
Min barndoms jular, a 1987 Christmas album from Kikki Danielsson